Ali Rafie (born January 11, 1938) is an Iranian theatre and cinema director and stage designer.

Education
He received a B.S and master's in sociology (1964–1968), as well as a B.S., master's, and Ph.D. in theater (1967–1974), from the Sorbonne in Paris.

Plays (as a writer, director and stage designer) 

  Antigone  by Sophocles, Molavi theatre, 1974
  Shivan va Esteghase Paye Divare Boland Shahr by Tankred Dorst, Shahr Theatre, 1976
  Khaterat va Kabous haye Yek Jamedan az Ghatle Amir Kabir by Ali Rafie, Shahr Theatre, 1976
  Crime and Punishment by Fyodor Dostoyevsky, Shahr Theatre, 1976
  Memory Of Sand Years (Yadegare Salhaye Shen) by Ali Rafie, Vahdat Hall, 1992
  Yek Rooze Khatere Angiz baraye Daneshmand Voo by a Chinese writer, Vahdat Hall, 1997
  Blood Wedding by Federico García Lorca, Vahdat Hall, 1998
  Romeo and Juliet by William Shakespeare, Vahdat Hall, 2000
  Shazde Ehtejab by Hooshang Golshiri, Vahdat Hall, 2001
  The Maids by Jean Genet, Shahr Theatre, 2002
  Never snows in Egypt by Mohamad Charmshir, Shahr Theatre, 2003
  Fox Hunting (شکار روباه) by Ali Rafie, Vahdat Hall, 2009
  Kitchen, (preparing), 2012

Stage Designing
  The Caucasian Chalk Circle by Bertolt Brecht directed by Hamid samandariyan, 1998
  Dokhtare Gol foroush directed by Parvane Mojde, 1999
  The Postman (Pablo Neroda) by Antonio Skarmeta directed by Alireza Kooshk Jalali, 1999

Tele Theater (as a director) 
  L'Avare ou l'École du mensonge by Molière, channel2 IRIB, 1993

Filmography
  Agha Yousef (writer and director), 2011
  The Fish Fall in Love (writer and director), 2005
  Plaisir d'amour en Iran directed by Agnès Varda (actor), 1976
  One Sings, the Other Doesn't directed by Agnès Varda (actor), 1977

References 
 www.irantheater.ir
 The Caucasian Chalk Circle
 www.iranact.com
  www.sourehcinema.com

Iranian theatre directors
1938 births
Living people
University of Paris alumni